Michael Mørkøv Christensen (born 30 April 1985) is a Danish professional racing cyclist, who currently rides for UCI WorldTeam . He is the brother of racing cyclists Jacob and Jesper Mørkøv.

Career
Born in Kokkedal, Mørkøv started as a track cyclist, becoming national champion in the points race in 2004. In the 2008 Olympic games, he won the silver medal in the team pursuit.

As a road cyclist, Mørkøv became national time trial champion in 2005. Mørkøv rode the 2010 and 2011 Giro d'Italia, finishing both. Mørkøv rode his first Tour de France in 2012, drawing attention by featuring in the most important escapes of the first three stages, where he gained enough points to lead the mountains classification. He held polka-dot jersey until stage 7, where stage winner Chris Froome took it.

In 2013, he won Stage 6 in the Vuelta a España.

In August 2015, it was announced that Mørkøv would join  for the 2016 season, at the request of Alexander Kristoff, with a view to working for Kristoff as part of his sprint train and as a domestique in the classics.

Mørkøv joined the Belgian Quick Step team in 2018 and since then has acted as a successful lead-out man for Sam Bennett and then, as a late replacement for Bennett as the team's sprinter for the 2021 Tour de France, Mark Cavendish. Mørkøv has been highly praised; Cavendish said “It’s a known fact Michael is the best leadout man in the world" and retired sprinter Marcel Kittel said "Many sprinters would win with him as the last man on the sprint train".

In 2021 when the Madison track race was reinstated into the Olympic Games of Tokyo 2020, Mørkøv won the gold medal (partnered with Lasse Norman Hansen)

Major results

Road

2004
 3rd Speditørløbet
2005
 1st  Team time trial, National Championships
2006
 1st Post Cuppen Skive
 2nd Team time trial, National Championships
 4th Rund um den Elm
2007
 2nd Ronde Van Vlaanderen Beloften
2008
 1st Midt Data Løbet
 1st  Team time trial, National Championships
 1st Stage 2 Giro del Capo
 2nd Speditørløbet
 2nd Duo Normand
 9th GP Nordjylland
2009
 7th Châteauroux Classic
2010
 1st Herlev-løbet
 3rd Time trial, National Championships
 4th Overall Tour du Limousin
2011
 1st Fyen Rundt
 3rd Overall Danmark Rundt
 8th GP Herning
 10th Himmerland Rundt
2012
 3rd Time trial, National Championships
 4th Overall Post Cuppen
1st Roskilde
1st Ringsted
 Tour de France
Held  after Stages 1–6
 Combativity award Stage 3 & 13
2013
 1st  Road race, National Championships
 1st Stage 6 Vuelta a España
 2nd Paris–Tours
 4th Overall Tour de l'Eurométropole
2014
 3rd Road race, National Championships
 3rd Overall Tour de Luxembourg
 5th Overall Tour of Qatar
2015
 1st Stage 6 Danmark Rundt
2016
 10th Gent–Wevelgem
2018
 1st  Road race, National Championships
 2nd Fyen Rundt
2019
 1st  Road race, National Championships
 3rd London–Surrey Classic
 5th Road race, UEC European Championships
 7th Cadel Evans Great Ocean Road Race
2020
 3rd Road race, National Championships
 5th Race Torquay
2021 
 5th Elfstedenronde
 8th Classic Brugge–De Panne
2022
 7th Milano–Torino

Grand Tour general classification results timeline

Track

2001
 3rd  Team pursuit, National Junior Track Championships
2002
 National Junior Championships
2nd Individual pursuit
2nd Team pursuit
2003
 National Junior Championships
1st  Points
2nd Team pursuit
 2nd Team pursuit, National Championships
2004
 National Championships
1st  Points
2nd Team pursuit
 3rd UIV Cup München
2005
 1st  Madison (with Alex Rasmussen), UEC European Under-23 Championships
 1st Overall UIV Cup
1st Stuttgart
1st Berlin
1st Amsterdam
2nd Copenhagen
3rd Bremen
 2nd  Madison (with Alex Rasmussen), UCI World Cup, Sydney
 2nd Madison, National Championships
2006
 National Championships
1st  Madison
1st  Points
3rd Team pursuit
3rd Scratch
 UCI World Cup 2005–06
1st  Madison (with Alex Rasmussen), Sydney
1st  Team pursuit, Sydney
3rd  Madison (with Alex Rasmussen), Moscow
 1st Omnium, Danmarksturneringen i Banecykling
 UCI World Cup 2006–07
2nd  Madison (with Alex Rasmussen), Sydney
2nd  Team pursuit, Sydney
 2nd Six Days of Grenoble (with Alex Rasmussen)
 3rd  Points, UEC European Under-23 Championships
2007
 National Championships
1st  Madison
2nd Points
3rd Team pursuit
 UCI World Cup 2006–07
1st  Madison (with Alex Rasmussen), Los Angeles
2nd  Team pursuit, Los Angeles
 1st Six Days of Grenoble (with Alex Rasmussen)
 3rd  Team pursuit, UCI World Championships
 3rd  Madison (with Alex Rasmussen), UCI World Cup 2007–08, Sydney
 3rd Six Days of Zürich (with Danny Stam)
2008
 National Championships
1st  Madison (with Alex Rasmussen)
1st  Team pursuit
1st  Scratch
1st  Points
 UCI World Cup
1st  Madison (with Alex Rasmussen), Copenhagen
2nd  Madison (with Alex Rasmussen), Los Angeles
2nd  Team pursuit, Copenhagen
2nd  Team pursuit, Los Angeles
 2nd  Team pursuit, Olympic Games
 2nd Six Days of Copenhagen (with Alex Rasmussen)
 3rd  Madison (with Alex Rasmussen), UCI World Championships
2009
 1st  Madison (with Alex Rasmussen), UCI World Championships
 1st  Madison (with Alex Rasmussen), National Championships
 1st Six Days of Copenhagen (with Alex Rasmussen)
 1st Six Days of Ghent (with Alex Rasmussen)
 2nd Six Days of Munich (with Alex Rasmussen)
2010
 1st  Madison (with Alex Rasmussen), National Championships
 1st Six Days of Berlin (with Alex Rasmussen)
 1st Six Days of Copenhagen (with Alex Rasmussen)
 3rd Six Days of Rotterdam (with Alex Rasmussen)
 3rd Six Days of Ghent (with Alex Rasmussen)
2011
 National Championships
1st  Madison (with Alex Rasmussen)
1st  Omnium
 1st Six Days of Copenhagen (with Alex Rasmussen)
 2nd  Team pursuit, UEC European Championships
 3rd Six Days of Berlin (with Alex Rasmussen)
2012
 1st Six Days of Amsterdam (with Pim Ligthart)
 2nd Six Days of Copenhagen (with Alex Rasmussen)
2013
 1st Six Days of Copenhagen (with Lasse Norman Hansen)
2014
 2nd Six Days of Copenhagen (with Alex Rasmussen)
 3rd Six Days of Rotterdam (with Alex Rasmussen)
2015
 1st Six Days of Ghent (with Iljo Keisse)
 1st Six Days of Copenhagen (with Alex Rasmussen)
 2nd Six Days of Rotterdam (with Alex Rasmussen)
2017
 1st Six Days of Copenhagen (with Lasse Norman Hansen)
 2nd Six Days of Rotterdam (with Lasse Norman Hansen)
2018
 1st Six Days of Copenhagen (with Kenny De Ketele)
2019
 1st  Madison (with Lasse Norman Hansen), UEC European Championships
2020
 1st  Madison (with Lasse Norman Hansen), UCI World Championships
2021
 1st  Madison (with Lasse Norman Hansen), Olympic Games
 1st  Madison (with Lasse Norman Hansen), UCI World Championships

References

External links

1985 births
Living people
People from Fredensborg Municipality
Danish male cyclists
Cyclists at the 2008 Summer Olympics
Cyclists at the 2012 Summer Olympics
Cyclists at the 2020 Summer Olympics
Olympic cyclists of Denmark
Olympic gold medalists for Denmark
Olympic silver medalists for Denmark
Olympic medalists in cycling
Medalists at the 2008 Summer Olympics
Medalists at the 2020 Summer Olympics
Danish Vuelta a España stage winners
UCI Track Cycling World Champions (men)
Danish track cyclists
Sportspeople from the Capital Region of Denmark